Tregellasia is a genus of birds in the family Petroicidae that are found in Australia and New Guinea.

The genus was introduced by the Australian ornithologist Gregory Mathews in 1912 with the pale-yellow robin (Tregellasia capito) as the type species. The genus name was chosen to honour the Australian field ornithologist Thomas Henry Tregellas (1864-1938).

Species
The genus contains the following two species:

References

 Del Hoyo, J.; Elliot, A. & Christie D. (editors). (2007). Handbook of the Birds of the World. Volume 12: Picathartes to Tits and Chickadees. Lynx Edicions. 

 
Petroicidae
Bird genera
Taxonomy articles created by Polbot